Johnathan Peter Akinyemi (born 22 November 1988 in Warrington, England) is a Nigerian slalom canoeist who has competed since 2007.

At the 2012 Summer Olympics he competed in the K1 event, finishing 21st in the heats, failing to qualify for the semifinals. He finished in 20th place in the same event at the 2016 Summer Olympics in Rio de Janeiro.

References

Sports-Reference.com profile

Nigerian male canoeists
1988 births
Living people
Olympic canoeists of Nigeria
Canoeists at the 2012 Summer Olympics
Canoeists at the 2016 Summer Olympics
English people of Nigerian descent
English people of Yoruba descent
Yoruba sportspeople